Kira Vincent-Davis is an American voice actress best known for her work in English-language versions of Japanese anime. She voices Lucy/Nyu in Elfen Lied, Anchovy in Girls und Panzer, Izuna Hatsuse in No Game No Life, Ayumu Kasuga in Azumanga Daioh, Mirai Kuriyama in Beyond the Boundary, Kansai in World's End Club, Minagi Tohno in Air, Mizuki Tachibana in Gravion, Rino Rando and Pucchan in Best Student Council, Chaika Trabant in Chaika - The Coffin Princess, and Mio Sakamoto in the Strike Witches series. She has worked with dubbing production companies ADV Films, Sentai Filmworks, and Funimation.

Filmography

Anime

Film

Video games

Music
 Voices for Peace (2006 album) – Vocals: "Fortunate Son"

References

External links
 
 

American voice actresses
Living people
Actresses from Houston
Place of birth missing (living people)
20th-century American actresses
21st-century American actresses
Year of birth missing (living people)
21st-century American singers